The Rio Pombo Nature Park, formerly the Serrinha do Alambari Municipal Park, is a municipal nature park in the state of Rio de Janeiro, Brazil.

Location

The Rio Pombo Nature Park is in the municipality of Resende, Rio de Janeiro.
The park is fully contained in the Serrinha do Alambari Environmental Protection Area.

Environment

The predominant vegetation is dense rain forest.
The environment is well preserved, with a variety of native trees and many varied bird species.
The rivers have waterfalls with clear, cold water.
The park houses the Camping Clube do Brasil, which is one of its main attractions.

History

The park was originally created as the Serrinha of Alambari Municipal Park (Parque Municipal da Serrinha do Alambari ) by article 172 of municipal law of 1988.
The Parque Municipal da Serrinha do Alambari was included in the Mantiqueira Mosaic, created on 11 December 2006.
It was renamed the Rio Pombo Nature Park and recategorized by municipal decree 3178 of 30 April 2009 and municipal law 2723 of 8 December 2009.
It is managed by the Resende municipal environment agency.

Notes

Sources

Protected areas of Rio de Janeiro (state)
Protected areas established in 1988
1988 establishments in Brazil
Municipal nature parks of Brazil